Robert Day may refer to:
Robert Day (antiquarian) (1836–1914), Irish antiquarian and photographer
Robert Day (Australian politician) (1886–1968), New South Wales politician
Robert H. Day (judge) (1867–1933), lawyer and judge in Ohio
Robert H. Day (soldier) (1835–1929), Union officer, railroad engineer and electrical engineer
Robert Day (Irish politician, born 1746) (1746–1841), Irish politician, barrister and judge
Robert Day (Irish politician, born 1884) (1884–1949), Irish Labour Party politician from Cork
Robert Day (cartoonist) (1900–1985), American cartoonist
Robert L. Day (1920–1999), mayor of Boise, Idaho
Robert Day (director) (1922–2017), English film director
Robert Day (footballer) (born 1944), former Australian rules footballer
Robert Addison Day (born 1943), businessman
Robert Day (basketball) (born 1982), American basketball player

See also
Bob Day (disambiguation)